Orthosomnia is a medical term for an unhealthy obsession with getting perfect sleep. The term was coined by researchers from Rush University Medical College and Northwestern University’s Feinberg School of Medicine in a case study published on February 15, 2017 in the Journal of Clinical Sleep Medicine titled "Orthosomnia: Are Some Patients Taking the Quantified Self Too Far?" in which the researchers noticed that the three patients having their sleep tracked spent excessive time in bed in order to increase their "sleep numbers", which might have actually made their Insomnia worse.

Dr. Sabra Abbott, an assistant professor of neurology at Northwestern University and one of the researchers involved in the study, first noticed Orthosomnia when she and her colleagues started having "a number of patients coming in with a phenomenon that didn't necessarily meet the classical description of insomnia, but that was still keeping them up at night". Abbott also noticed that because the people suffering from Orthosomnia became so dependent on their sleep tracking devices, "they were actually destroying their sleep" because they weren't measuring up to what their tracker considered a "good" amount of sleep.

See also 

 Orthorexia nervosa

References 

Sleep disorders